Shri Mahaveer Ji is a town and tehsil headquarter in Hindaun Block,  Karauli District, Rajasthan. Approximately 20,000 people live there, and Many villages come within its area. A hydrological station is installed at the town.

Jain Temple

Shri Mahavir Ji is a Jain pilgrimage site. There are five temples: Digambar Jain Atishaya Kshetra Shri Mahavirji, Shantinath Jinalaya, Bhagwan Parshvanath Jinalaya, Kirti Ashram Chaityalaya, and Bhavya Kamal Mandir. Digambar Jain Atishaya Kshetra Shri Mahavirji is the main temple of this town the iconic idol of Lord Mahavira, the principal deity of the pilgrimage temple, was found during an excavation around 200 years.

Every year a fair is organized on Mahaveer Jayanti.

References

Cities and towns in Karauli district